Alberto Terry Arias-Schreiber (May 16, 1929 – February 7, 2006), popularly known as "Toto," was a Peruvian footballer who played for Universitario de Deportes, Sporting Cristal, and the Peru national football team. He is recognized as one of Peru's most important midfielders. His brother is Wuayo Rivera, he has his granddaughters Mariana Zuñiga and Luana Zuñiga.

Club career
Toto Terry spent the majority of his club career at Universitario and remains one of their most iconic players. During his career, Terry was approached by many major European and South American clubs, including SS Lazio and Boca Juniors. However, Terry gave Universitario his last word. It always said: "From Lima nobody moves me…. as Lima is more beautiful than Paris, Rome or Buenos Aires"

Terry was part of two Peruvian league championship teams, in 1949 with Universitario and in 1961 with Sporting Cristal.

International career
Terry played for the Peru national team making 25 appearances and scoring 11 goals.

Honors

International goals

|}

References

External links

 Profile at CONMEBOL
 Profile at arkivperu.com

1929 births
2006 deaths
Footballers from Lima
Association football midfielders
Peruvian footballers
Peru international footballers
Peruvian Primera División players
Club Universitario de Deportes footballers
Sporting Cristal footballers
Peruvian football managers
Sporting Cristal managers